The Eminent 310 Unique is a home electronic organ that was built and introduced in 1972 by the Dutch organ manufacturer Eminent, at the time based in Bodegraven, the Netherlands. It was the first organ to include a string section, making it the first commercial polyphonic string synthesizer on the market. It is prominently featured on Jean Michel Jarre's albums Oxygène (1977) and Équinoxe (1978).

The technology for the string section was later released as a standalone instrument, the Solina String Ensemble (rebadged by ARP as the ARP String Ensemble for the US market), which saw wide use in popular music.

References

External links 

 Eminent 310 Salvation Project
 Eminent 310

Electronic organs
String synthesizers
Lelystad